Little Langford is a hamlet and former civil parish in Wiltshire, England. It is in the Wylye valley, to the south of the river; the grass fields adjacent to the river were traditionally flood meadows.

In 1086, the Domesday Book survey recorded estates held by Wilton Abbey, Glastonbury Abbey and Edward of Salisbury.

The civil parish was added to Steeple Langford parish in 1934. In 1990, the Wilton estate owned nearly all of the land in the former parish.

Notable sights

The Anglican Church of St Nicholas of Mira is Grade II* listed.  It dates from the 12th century and was rebuilt in 1864 by T.H. Wyatt, reusing a 12th-century doorway on the south side of the nave. Alexander Hyde, later Bishop of Salisbury, was rector from 1634.

Little Langford farmhouse (c.1858) has a Victorian Gothic entrance tower, lancet windows and crenellations.

Just to the south of the village lies the Iron Age hill-fort of Grovely Castle.

References

External links
 
 Little Langford at genuki.org.uk
 

Hamlets in Wiltshire
Former civil parishes in Wiltshire